The Schick–Ostolasa Farmstead in Boise, Idaho is listed on the National Register of Historic Places. The Schick family were German-Russian immigrants to the United States. 

The listing includes seven contributing buildings:  the Schick/Ostolasa farmhouse, Red House, a root cellar, a wood shed, a saddle barn, a horse barn, and a chicken house, and a non-contributing utility shed.  A community barn built in 1997 on the location of former lambing sheds is not included in the listed area.  The Schick/Ostolasa Farmhouse was built c.1864-1868, and was extended in 1870 and at other times.

The farmstead was listed on the National Register of Historic Places in 2006.

See also
Henry Schick Barn, also NRHP-listed in Idaho

References

German-Russian culture in Idaho
Late 19th and Early 20th Century American Movements architecture
Houses completed in 1868
Buildings and structures in Boise, Idaho
Farms on the National Register of Historic Places in Idaho
National Register of Historic Places in Ada County, Idaho